Ansambel Roka Žlindre is a Slovene musical group named after accordion player Rok Žlindra. The other members of the group are Barbara Ogrinc (born 4 February 1990) (vocals), Nejc Drobnič (acoustic guitar) and Rok Modic (double bass).

Eurovision 2010
Together with Kalamari, Ansambel Roka Žlindre represented Slovenia in the Eurovision Song Contest 2010 with the song "Narodnozabavni rock".

They did not qualify for the Eurovision Song Contest 2010 final from the second semifinal, reaching 16th place out of 17 with 6 points.

References

Eurovision Song Contest entrants of 2010
Eurovision Song Contest entrants for Slovenia